Nubkaure Amenemhat II, also known as Amenemhet II, was the third pharaoh of the 12th Dynasty of ancient Egypt. Although he ruled for at least 35 years, his reign is rather obscure, as well as his family relationships.

Family

Archaeological findings have provided the name of Amenemhat's mother, the "king's mother" Neferu III, but not the name of his father. Nevertheless, it is commonly assumed that he was a son of his predecessor Senusret I. An early attestation of Amenemhat may have come from the tomb of the namesake nomarch Amenemhat, buried at Beni Hasan. This nomarch, who lived under Senusret I, escorted the "King's son Ameny" in an expedition to Nubia, and it is believed that this prince Ameny was no other than Amenemhat II in his youth.

The identity of Amenemhat's queen consort is unknown. Many royal women were buried within his pyramid complex, but their relationships with the king are unclear: a queen Keminub must be dated to the later 13th Dynasty, and three "king's daughters" named Ita, Itaweret, and Khenmet may have been Amenemhat's daughters, although a definitive proof is still lacking. His successor Senusret II was likely his son, although this is never explicitly stated anywhere. Other children were prince Amenemhatankh and the princesses Nofret II and Khenemetneferhedjet, likely the same person of Khenemetneferhedjet I; both of these women later became wives of their purported brother Senusret II. A woman queen and king's mother called Senet is known from three statues. Her royal husband and sons are not known. Amenemhat II might be her husband.

Reign

Accession

Amenemhat II was once believed to have shared a period of coregency with his predecessor Senusret I, an hypothesis based on the double-dated stela of an official named Wepwawetō (Leiden, V4) that bears the regnal year 44 of Senusret I and the regnal year 2 of Amenemhat II. The existence of such coregency is now considered unlikely and the meaning of the double-date on the stela is interpreted as a time range when Wepwawetō was in charge, from Senusret I's year 44 to Amenemhat II's year 2.

Account of reign

The most important record for Amenemhat's early reign is on fragments of the so-called Annals of Amenemhat II unearthed at Memphis (later reused during the 19th Dynasty). It provides records of donations to temples and, sometimes, of political events. Among the latter, there is a mention of a military expedition into Asia, the destruction of two cities – Iuai and Iasy – whose location is still unknown, and the coming of tribute-bearers from Asia and Kush.
Under Amenemhat II several mining expeditions are known: at least 3 in the Sinai, one in the Wadi Gasus (year 28) and one in search for amethysts in the Wadi el-Hudi. He is known to have ordered building works at Heliopolis, Herakleopolis, Memphis, in the Eastern Delta, and rebuilt a ruined temple at Hermopolis. There are some mentions of the building of a "First temple" but it is still unclear what it should have been. A well-known finding associated with Amenemhat II is the Great Sphinx of Tanis (Louvre A23), later usurped by many other pharaohs. He is also named on the boxes of a treasure of silver objects found under the temple of Montu at Tod: notably, many of these objects are not of Egyptian workmanship but rather Aegean, evidencing contacts between Egypt and foreign civilizations in the Middle Kingdom. Many private stelae bears Amenemhat's cartouches – and sometimes even his regnal years – but are of little help in providing useful information about the events of his reign.

Court officials
Some members of Amenemhat's court are known. Senusret was the vizier at the beginning of his reign, and one of his successors was Ameny, later likely followed by Siese who had a remarkable career and also was a treasurer and a high steward before his vizierate. Beside Siese, other known treasurers were Rehuerdjersen and Merykau. The "overseer of the gateway", Khentykhetywer, was buried near the king's pyramid. Other known officials were the "overseers of the chamber", Snofru and Senitef, and the royal scribe and iry-pat Samont. As great overseer of troops, a certain Ameny dates most likely under the king.

Succession
Amenemhat II and his successor Senusret II shared a brief coregency, the only unquestionable one of the whole Middle Kingdom. Unlike most of the double-dated monuments, the stela of Hapu from Konosso explicitly states that these two kings ruled together for a while and that the regnal year 3 of Senusret II equates the regnal year 35 of Amenemhat II. Amenemhat's year 35 on the stela of Hapu is also the highest date known for him.

Tomb

Unlike his two predecessors, who built their pyramids at Lisht, Amenemhat II chose Dahshur for this purpose, a location which had not been used as a royal cemetery since the time of Sneferu and his Red Pyramid (4th Dynasty). At the present time, Amenemhat's pyramid – originally called Amenu-sekhem, but best known today as the White Pyramid – is poorly preserved and excavated. The mortuary temple adjacent the pyramid was called Djefa-Amenemhat. Many people were buried within the pyramid complex, whose tombs were rediscovered by Jacques de Morgan in 1894/5: the three aforementioned princesses Ita, Itaweret, and Khenmet were found untouched, still containing their beautiful jewels, and also the tombs of the lady Sathathormeryt, the treasurer Amenhotep, and the queen Keminub; unlike the others, the latter two were looted in antiquity and are dated to the subsequent 13th Dynasty.

References

Bibliography

External links

19th-century BC deaths
20th-century BC Pharaohs
19th-century BC Pharaohs
Pharaohs of the Twelfth Dynasty of Egypt